A list of American films released in 1990.

Highest-grossing films
Ghost, starring Patrick Swayze, Demi Moore, Whoopi Goldberg, Tony Goldwyn, Rick Aviles, $505,702,588
Home Alone, starring Macaulay Culkin, Joe Pesci, Daniel Stern, John Heard, Catherine O'Hara, $476,684,675 	 
Pretty Woman, starring Julia Roberts, Richard Gere, $463,407,268
Dances with Wolves, starring Kevin Costner, Mary McDonnell, Graham Greene, $424,208,848
Total Recall, starring Arnold Schwarzenegger, $261,299,840
Die Hard 2, starring Bruce Willis, $240,031,094
Teenage Mutant Ninja Turtles, $201,965,915
Kindergarten Cop, starring Arnold Schwarzenegger, Penelope Ann Miller, $201,957,688
The Hunt for Red October, starring Sean Connery, Alec Baldwin, $200,512,643
Dick Tracy, starring Warren Beatty, Madonna, Glenne Headly, Al Pacino, $162,738,726

A–B

C

D

E

F

G

H

I

J

K

L

M

N

O

P

Q

R

S

T

V

W

X–Z

See also
 1990 in American television
 1990 in the United States

External links

 
 List of 1990 box office number-one films in the United States

1990
Films
Lists of 1990 films by country or language